Pailacar or Paylacar was a leader of Purén, who led a force of 2000 warriors in the defeat of the Spanish army of Don Miguel Avendaño de Velasco in the Battle of Purén in September 1570.

References

Sources 
 Alonso de Góngora Marmolejo, Historia de Todas las Cosas que han Acaecido en el Reino de Chile y de los que lo han gobernado (1536-1575) (History of All the Things that Have happened in the Kingdom of Chile and of those that have governed it (1536-1575), Edición digital a partir de Crónicas del Reino de Chile, Madrid, Atlas, 1960, pp. 75–224, (on line in Spanish) (History of Chile 1536-1575)
 Pedro Mariño de Lobera, Crónica del Reino de Chile , escrita por el capitán Pedro Mariño de Lobera....reducido a nuevo método y estilo por el Padre Bartolomé de Escobar. Edición digital a partir de Crónicas del Reino de Chile Madrid, Atlas, 1960, pp. 227-562, (Biblioteca de Autores Españoles ; 569-575).  Biblioteca Virtual Miguel de Cervantes (on line in Spanish) (History of Chile 1535-1595)
 Diego de Rosales,   Historia General del Reino de Chile, Flandes Indiano, Tomo II,  Valparaíso 1877 - 1878. (1554-1625)  
 Diego Barrios Arana,  Historia general de Chile, Tomo segundo, Capítulo V Gobierno de Bravo de Saravia: administración civil. Fin de su gobierno y supresión de la Real Audiencia (1569-1575)

16th-century Mapuche people
People of the Arauco War
Indigenous military personnel of the Americas